Edgar Broughton Band is the self-titled third album by the Edgar Broughton Band. The album is known amongst fans as "The Meat Album", as the album cover features meat on hangers in a warehouse; a human can also be seen hanging amongst the meat. The 2004 CD reissue features three bonus tracks. Several outside musicians were used on this album including Mike Oldfield of Tubular Bells fame.

Track listing

"Evening Over Rooftops" (Robert Edgar Broughton, Victor Unitt) – 5:00
"The Birth" (R. E. Broughton) – 3:21
"Piece of My Own" (R. E. Broughton) – 2:46
"Poppy" (R. E. Broughton) – 2:14
"Don't Even Know Which Day It Is" (R. E. Broughton, Steve Broughton, Victor Unitt) – 4:20
"House of Turnabout" (R. E. Broughton) – 3:08
"Madhatter" (R. E. Broughton, S. Broughton, Unitt) – 6:14
"Getting Hard/What Is a Woman For?" (R. E. Broughton, S. Broughton, Arthur Grant, Unitt) – 7:29
"Thinking of You" (S. Broughton, Unitt) – 2:04
"For Doctor Spock Parts 1 & 2" (R. E. Broughton, S. Broughton, Grant, Unitt) – 3:50

2004 CD reissue bonus tracks
"Hotel Room" (R. E. Broughton) – 4:04 (A-side of "Harvest HAR 5040") 
"Call Me a Liar" (R. E. Broughton) – 4:27 (B-side of "Harvest HAR 5040")
"Bring It on Home" (Willie Dixon) – 3:27 (Previously unreleased)

Personnel

Edgar Broughton Band
 Edgar Broughton – vocals, guitar
 Arthur Grant – bass guitar, vocals
 Steve Broughton – drums, vocals
 Victor Unitt – guitar, harmonica, piano, organ, vocals

Additional musicians
 The Ladybirds – vocals (track 1)
 Johnny van Derek – violin (track 3)
 P. Harold Fatt – vocals (track 5)
 David Bedford – piano (track 8)
 Mike Oldfield – mandolin (track 9)
 Roy Harper – backing vocals (CD track 12)

Technical
 Peter Jenner – producer
 Peter Mew – engineer
 David Bedford – arranger (cellos & brass)
 Hipgnosis - cover photography
 Adrian Boot, Nigel Leaman - photography

References

Edgar Broughton Band albums
1971 albums
Harvest Records albums
Albums with cover art by Hipgnosis
Albums produced by Peter Jenner
Repertoire Records albums